Red Island is a former village about 12 miles northwest of Placentia, Newfoundland and Labrador in Placentia Bay, on an island of the same name.  It had five families in 1864, and had a population of approximately 350 in the 1945 census.1 The village of 283 was depopulated in October 1968, during the provincial government's Resettlement Program. In modern times, many people have cabins there and use it as a summer retreat. It recorded a 1986 population of 1, during an attempt to repopulate the island.  This failed, however, when no teacher could be found for the proposed re-opened school.

External links
Red Island website

Ghost towns in Newfoundland and Labrador